Brian Raman (born 14 October 1996) is a professional Belgian darts player who plays in events of the Professional Darts Corporation. In 2021 he became the second Belgian World Darts Federation world number one, after Leo Laurens in 1993.

Career 
In 2019, Raman won the Denmark Masters, beating Willem Mandigers in the Final. In September 2019, he qualified for the 2020 BDO World Darts Championship and played Paul Hogan in the Preliminary Round, losing 3 sets to 1. In 2020, he attended PDC Q-school, where he reached a semi-final on day one of the final phase, losing out to Harald Leitinger.

Raman won a PDC Tour Card at 2022 Q School by winning the second event of the final phase. He beat Jules van Dongen in the final 6–4.

World Championship results

BDO/WDF
 2020: Preliminary round (lost to Paul Hogan 1–3)
 2022: Quarter-finals (lost to Richard Veenstra 2-4)

Performance timeline 

PDC European Tour

References

External links 
 

Living people
Belgian darts players
1996 births
Professional Darts Corporation current tour card holders
People from Brasschaat
Sportspeople from Antwerp Province